General elections were held in Senegal on 25 February 1968 to elect a President and National Assembly. After a series of party mergers, the country had become a one-party state, with the Senegalese Progressive Union (UPS) as the sole legal party, As a result, its leader, Léopold Sédar Senghor, was the only candidate in the presidential election and was re-elected unopposed. In the National Assembly election, voters were presented with a list of 80 UPS candidates to vote for. Voter turnout was 94.7% in the presidential election and 93.0% in the National Assembly election.

Results

President

National Assembly

References

Senegal
Elections in Senegal
1968 in Senegal
One-party elections
Single-candidate elections
Presidential elections in Senegal
February 1968 events in Africa